C. Basavalingaiah (born 29 July 1958, India) is an Indian theatre director and theatre activist. He has been appointed as the first director of the National School of Drama Bangalore Centre. He directed several stage plays that received wide attention. He is an alumnus of the National School of Drama. The views expressed by him on challenges faced by theatre in India today are thought provoking He received many awards including Karnataka State Award Rajyotsava Award in 2001.

Biography

C. Basavalingaiah was born in Bangalore, Karnataka. After his school and college he was selected for a three-year course in the National School of Drama.

Education

Post Graduation in Theatre Direction, National School of Drama, Delhi
MA in Kannada Literature, University of Mysore

Major contributions

Inspired by B. V. Karanth, his subsequent efforts have significantly contributed to develop theater as a medium of entertainment and a tool for social change. Kuvempu's Malegalalli madumagalu (The Bride in the Mountains) a popular play was directed by Basavalingiah. This play was staged more than 15 times in Bangalore and Mysore, and this play was showcased to nearly 60,000 audience.

His contributions were featured in Ramayana Stories in Modern South India: An Anthology

Plays directed

Devanooru Mahadeva's Kusumabale
The Road
Antigone
Andhayuga
Gandhi V/S Gandhi
Shoodra Thapasvi
Tippuvina Kanasugalu
King Oedipus
Berlge Koral
Alamana Adbhuta Nyaya
Erobi
Shakespeare's A Mid Summer Night's Dreams
Agni Mattu Male
Hitler V/s. Brecht
Malegalalli madumagalu (based on the book by Kuvempu)
2009 and 2014 – Manushya Jati Tanode Valam – a sound and light show for Information Department
2006 - Lankesharige Namaskaara, (stage adaptation of P. Lankesh's one act plays, poetry, short story, teeke-tippani, etc.)
2005 - Directed a mega play JANAPADA MAHABHAARATH for children, in which 400 children performed and was well appreciated by the mass & media.
Samaba Shiva Prahasana
Pagala Raja
Jangamadedege
MacBeth
Venara Vemana
Sewooz Nagarath Shin Shular Brutho
Ekalavya's Thumb
Edegaarike

Awards

2010 - Shivakumara State Level Award, honoured by Sirigere Bruhanmata, Sanehalli, Karnataka
2010 - Sri K.V. Shankaregowda Award
2001 - Karnataka State Award (Rajyotsava Award)
1996 - Karnataka Nataka Academy, Honorary Fellowship Award

References

Living people
National School of Drama alumni
1958 births
Kannada people
Indian theatre directors